"Crying in My Sleep" was the second single released from Squeeze's ninth album, Play, in the U.S. It was released only as a single-track, promotional CD, and reached number 14 on the Modern Rock Tracks chart.

Track listing
 "Crying in My Sleep" (4:07)

External links
Squeeze discography at Squeezenet

Squeeze (band) songs
1991 singles
Songs written by Glenn Tilbrook
Songs written by Chris Difford
1991 songs
Reprise Records singles